Matthew Olshefski (a.k.a. Shirtless Violinist) is a YouTuber from the Seattle area commonly known as "The Shirtless Violinist".

Olshefski (pronounced Ol-shef-ski) began playing the violin at age 3 and has since become a professional musician and teacher. Olshefski began performing shirtless while on a vacation trip down the Pacific Coast, when Olshefski's boyfriend used an iPhone to video Matthew playing the violin outdoors overlooking the Ocean. Olshefski is openly gay and his music often incorporates LGBTQ elements.

Early life 

Olshefski started playing the violin at 3 years old. Along with his younger brother and sister, Olshefski formed a trio called "Two Hits and Miss". They played nationwide, with the support of their parents and music teachers.

Musical performance 

Olshefski has accompanied Josh Grobin and Andrea Bocelli during Seattle performances. In addition to being a solo performer, Olshefski has also been a Concert Master.

Since 2016 Olshefski has produced music videos, covering music such as "Over the Rainbow" the theme from Stranger Things, the theme from Game of Thrones and "Never Enough" from The Greatest Showman.

In September 2016, Olshefski organized a charity challenge. At the end of a video he encouraged viewers to post a picture of themselves giving to a local charity on social media for a chance to be featured in an upcoming music video.

Olshefski's music sometimes includes gay themes, such as his music video based on the Disney movie The Little Mermaid. Other examples include music from Star Wars, Cinderella and Moana. In 2018, Olshefski performed a duet with gay singer/songwriter Tom Goss of Ed Sheeran's song "Perfect".

References

External links 
 
 
 

1984 births
Living people
LGBT YouTubers
American YouTubers
American gay musicians
20th-century LGBT people
21st-century LGBT people